Something's Wrong is a compilation album of studio recordings and unreleased live tracks by Violent Femmes in 2001. Tracks 1 and 3-12 are studio recordings from 1995 to 1997. Some songs are alternate versions 
of previously released songs. Tracks 16-22 are live recordings selected from the 1999 Viva Wisconsin sessions. Tracks 2 and 13-15 are demos recorded in 1995 and 1996.

The album was released only in MP3 format, by the online store eMusic.com.

Track listing

Personnel
 Gordon Gano – Lead vocals, guitar
 Brian Ritchie – Bass, keyboards, baglama, didgeridoo, vocal
 Guy Hoffman – Drums, vocal, percussion

Additional musicians
 Petra Haden – Violin (track 3)
 Pierre Henry – Musique Concrete composition and arrangement (track 11)
 Violent Femmes – Sounds and samples (track 11)
 Sigmund Snopek III – Piano (track 19), flute (track 22)

References

Violent Femmes compilation albums
2001 compilation albums
Self-released albums